K. C. Nanjunde Gowda (c. 1928 – 4 October 2012) was a businessman and one of the top Kannada film producers, exhibitors, financiers and distributors. He is credited with producing some of the classic films in the annals of Kannada film industry, namely, Sharapanjara, Huliya Halina Mevu, Babruvahana, Bangarada Panjara, Daari Thappida Maga and many more.

He distributed more than 300 films and won several awards, notably – the Dr. Rajkumar award from Karnataka state government and the Phalke Academy award from the Dada Saheb Phalke committee for the year 2005.

Biography
He was born to Chowdaiah and Muddamma as the eldest of six children at Konenahalli village of Doddaballapura, Karnataka. With no interest in education, he ventured into the Sericulture business in stages, with successful results. He then ventured into construction of film theatres – Navrang theatre in Bangalore, Rajkamal Theatre in Doddaballapur and Urvashi Theatre, Bangalore. During this time, he started the KCN Movies banner to distribute the Kannada films; Belli Moda, directed by S.R. Puttanna Kanagal was his first Kannada film as a distributor. He later went on to distribute more than 300 films. For the progress of KCN Gowda in business, his brothers were the backbone along with his two sons – K.C.N. Chandrashekar and K.C.N. Mohan, who are also film producers. He is a veteran Producer–Director, making memorable Kannada films, including blockbuster Bangarada Manushya, starring Dr. Rajkumar.

Besides giving entertainment, the flagship of KCN always vouched for quality and morality in its selection of subjects and film-making. He always wanted to bring the luxury found in other languages onto the Kannada screen. In the days of KCN Gowda, the infrastructural facilities were not so good and there was struggle for the shaping of good quality films. For producing color films, the raw stock was not available. Using his strength, he was responsible for the importing of raw stock for color film production directly from foreign countries. He took challenges to boost up the quality of film-making in the Kannada Film Industry.

His first such challenge was taking up T.K. Rama Rao's Bangaradha Manushya, Starring Dr. Rajkumar, directed by Siddalingaiah, which created the birth of a matinee idol of South Indian Cinema. Sharapanjara, starring Kalpana, directed by S.R. Puttanna Kanagal was another milestone in the career of K.C.N. Gowda.

He produced his first Kannada film Bhale Jodi starring Rajkumar in a double role under Rajkamal Arts in the early 1970s. For this film, he launched a unique publicity strategy never employed by anyone before in Karnataka – he erected an 80-foot cutout of Rajkumar at the time of the release of this film with prior state government permission – his maiden film was a huge hit inspiring him to produce more than fifty popular movies in the following years. The mega success of the maiden film and the support he got from Kannada film viewers inspired him to go in for popular subjects for the Kannada screen. Bangarada Manushya ran for two years in States Theatre Bangalore, while Sharapanjara was a silver jubilee film. It was the right fruit for his discipline and devotion in work. The K.C.N. Brothers ventured into different subjects in movies, including social, mythological, historical and entertaining films. He introduced many new talents to Kannada cinema in the field of artistes and technicians. There was no shortfall in the hospitality in the production house of the KCN Gowda banner. Dr. Rajkumar was appreciating K.C.N. Gowda as "Anna Dhaata", affectionately.

The K.C.N. Gowda family crossed 50 useful and successful years in filmdom, the prestigious production house of Karnataka. It has made the South Indian film industry in Tamil, Telugu and Malayalam to turn back and take a look at the marvelous work it has done. The California-based Gold Stone Company was contacted by K.C.N. Gowda in giving a facelift of color to the black and white Satya Harischandra of K.C.N. Gowda.

He also re-released his prior black and white produced movies in "color" and using "3D technology" lately, he colourised most of his favourite hero Dr. Rajkumar movies such as Satya Harischandra, Kasthuri Nivasa, Kaviratna Kalidasa, Babruvahana and Veera Kesari. For the film Satya Harischandra, which he produced in 1965 with 5.5 lakhs(.55 
million) rupees budget, he re-released on cinema scope, color and using DTS technology for the same film in 2008 with 3.5 crores. In another of his lovable statements he said "Live like Dr. Rajkumar. I have invested crores on Sathya Harischandra to make it color. It is only because of admiration to Dr Rajakumar. He is remembered for his lines 'Failure became stepping stone to success. Those who come here for business will not go away so easily.'" (  K.C.N. Gowda died aged 84.

Filmography
 Nammura Raja
 Babruvahana
 Bangarada Panjara
 Jayasimha
 Huli Halina Mevu
 Kasturi Nivasa
 Bhakta Siriyala
 Ranga Nayaki
 Bangaarada Manushya
 Sanadhi Appanna
 Antima Teerpu
 Dhari Thappida Maga
 Namma Samsara
 Thayi Devaru
 Doorada Betta
 Satya Harishchandra
 Belli Moda

Awards
 Phalke Academy award in 2005
 Dr. Rajkumar award
 Karnataka Film Directors Association award

Death
KCN Gowda died following a brief illness on 4 October 2012 at the age of 84.

References

External links
 BALIDRE RAJKUMAR ANTHE BAALI – KCN GOWDA
 Kasturi Nivasa 1971 - Bangalore-based financier K. C. N. Gowda, agreed to finance Rs. 3.5 lakh for the project.
 KCN Gowda - Film producer and Distributor
Thats Kannada 
NRI Links
Deccan Herald
The Hindu newspaper. Article "Film fans association honours artistes, technicians"
deccanherald.com Deccan Herald
 Kasturi Nivasa colour version to hit silver screen
 TRIBUTE TO DR RAJ IN KCN GOWD STYLE – 4 RAJ FILMS IN 3D SYSTEM!
 'Satya Harishchandra' CDs to be screened in schools soon
 

2012 deaths
Kannada film producers
Film producers from Bangalore
1920s births
People from Bangalore Rural district